Broadway Extension can refer to one of the following:

 A planned extension of the Gloucestershire Warwickshire Railway in England
 Millennium Line Broadway extension, a planned extension of the Millennium Line in Vancouver, Canada
 A section of U.S. Route 77 in Oklahoma City, Oklahoma, United States